A "bad call" is an informal term used in sports to describe a referee decision, or "call", that is incorrect or perceived to be incorrect. Bad calls have been associated with all sports involving referees or judges.

A bad call is made by a game referee when:
 An incorrect application of a game rule is made. 
 An incorrect interpretation of a specific game event is made.  
 An infraction of a game rule is unseen or ignored and the specific rule violation is left unaddressed.

Public outcry following a highly visible and questionable call might lead to a public clarification of existing rules or in rare instances, an actual change in rules.

Author Andrew Caruso notes that "Bad calls or bad breaks are part of every sport. That's life."

"Bad call" is used outside of sports colloquially to quickly label a bad decision: "His promotion was a bad call.", "He took her to dinner with his mom; bad call."

Video review practices

Because of the accusations of bad calls involving plays in the National Football League, starting in 1986, the league began adopting rules to allow the use of instant replay in settling disputed calls by the on field officials. Other leagues (including Major League Baseball, FIFA, ULEB, and the NBA) have come up with differing systems to utilize video replay or to limit its usage.

The NFL did not innovate the process, rather they followed the lead of their competitor at the time - the USFL - which tried to differentiate itself from its more established rival by several rule differences, including the two-point conversion, a faster moving clock based on NCAA rules, and the use of replay when challenged by one of the teams.

Compensation practices

Sports fans have frequently commented on what they perceive as "make-up" calls, in which referees compensate for a questionable call by penalizing the other team during the course of the game. One analysis focused on strikes and balls in baseball, finding that the zones shifted soon after what the authors refer to as errant calls.

Notable examples
At the 1961 Dixie 400, NASCAR made a bad call and declared Bunkie Blackburn the winner, after not counting one of David Pearson's laps.  Most spectators had left before they gave the win to the correct person.
At the 1972 Olympic Men's Basketball Final, the clock was reset to give the Soviet Union three opportunities to win the game over the previously undefeated United States basketball team.  Team USA refused to accept the silver medal.  Captain Kenny Davis has written into his will that his heirs cannot accept the silver medal on his behalf.
In 1985, organ player Wilbur Snapp was ejected from a baseball game, after playing Three Blind Mice in response to what he saw as a bad call by the umpire.
In the 1985 World Series, the St. Louis Cardinals lost to the Kansas City Royals, in part to a bad call made in Game 6. Umpire Don Denkinger called the Royals Jorge Orta safe when TV replays showed he was out. The Royals eventually would score 2 runs in the inning and win the game 2-1.
In 1990, the University of Colorado was given five downs due to a counting error by the officials.  Colorado beat the University of Missouri on the fifth down, the last play of the game.
During the 1991 Philippine Basketball League season, a bad call during a game caused the fans to begin pelting the court, and the game was halted for 20 minutes.
In the 1997 National League Championship Series Game 5, umpire Eric Gregg gave Florida Marlins pitcher Liván Hernández an unusually wide strike zone. Hernández set a record 15 strike outs against the Atlanta Braves throughout the game.  The final out of the game came when Fred McGriff was called out on a pitch that TV replays showed was a foot outside of the strike zone.

See also
Referee
Umpire abuse

Further reading
 Bad Call: Technology's Attack on Referees and Umpires and How to Fix It. Harry Collins, Robert Evans, Christopher Higgins. MIT Press, 2016. .

References

Sports culture